The 1974 German Grand Prix was a Formula One motor race held at the Nürburgring on 4 August 1974. It was race 11 of 15 in both the 1974 World Championship of Drivers and the 1974 International Cup for Formula One Manufacturers. It was the 36th German Grand Prix and the 33rd to be held at the Nürburgring complex of circuits. The race was won by Swiss driver Clay Regazzoni driving a Ferrari 312B3. Regazzoni led every lap on the way to his second Grand Prix victory, some four years after his debut victory at the 1970 Italian Grand Prix. South African driver Jody Scheckter was second driving a Tyrrell 007 ahead of Argentine driver Carlos Reutemann (Brabham BT44).

Since the 1973 event the main straight had been widened and resurfaced. In response to new FIA regulations stating that all FIA-mandated races must have safety walls, the organizers replaced the bushes lining the straight with Armco and placed sandy surface where grass could grow on both sides of the straight. Regazzoni's win, coupled with Niki Lauda's first lap crash, put the Swiss Ferrari driver back into the lead of the championship he had previous held earlier in the year. Lauda crashed his Ferrari 312B3 attempting to pass Scheckter. Emerson Fittipaldi also was an early retirement after making a very slow start in his McLaren M23 and was struck by his teammate Denny Hulme putting out both cars within a lap. Hulme attempted to restart the race in a spare car and was disqualified for doing so. Mike Hailwood was another to crash, having a large accident on the second last lap at Pflanzgarten in his McLaren M23. The former motorcyclist received a badly broken leg in the accident which became a career-ending injury. Occasional showers fell during the race, contributing to the accident toll which also claimed Patrick Depailler (Tyrrell 007), Jacques Laffite (Williams FW02) and John Watson (Brabham BT44). Just 14 cars finished the race, although Hailwood would also be classified as a finisher, out of the 26 starters. There was six cars who failed to qualify including Chris Amon (Amon AF101) who pulled out due to illness.

Howden Ganley also suffered a serious accident during Friday's practice. The rear suspension failed on the Maki at Hatzenbach and he swerved right into the Armco barrier, ripping off the nose section of the car. Ganley's legs were dangling out the front of the car. He got out by himself but he collapsed when he got to the fence, his ankles seriously injured. This led to Ganley's retirement from Formula 1.

Regazzoni moved into a three-point lead in the championship over Scheckter. Former points leader Lauda dropped to third, six points behind his Ferrari teammate and just one ahead of Fittipaldi. Ferrari moved eight points clear of McLaren in the constructor's standings.

Classification

Qualifying 

*Positions with a pink background indicate drivers that failed to qualify. Ashley failed to qualify, but started at the back of the grid.

Race

Championship standings after the race

Drivers' Championship standings

Constructors' Championship standings

Note: Only the top five positions are included for both sets of standings. Only the best 7 results from the first 8 races and the best 6 results from the last 7 races counted towards the Championship. Numbers without parentheses are Championship points; numbers in parentheses are total points scored.

References

German Grand Prix
German Grand Prix
European Grand Prix
German Grand Prix
Sport in Rhineland-Palatinate